Dixon v. Alabama, 294 F.2d 150 (5th Cir. 1961) was a landmark 1961 U.S. federal court decision that spelled the end of the doctrine that colleges and universities could act in loco parentis to discipline or expel their students.  It has been called "the leading case on due process for students in public higher education".

The case arose when Alabama State College, a then-segregated black college, expelled six students, including the named appellant, St. John Dixon, for unspecified reasons, but presumably because of their participation in demonstrations during the Civil Rights Movement.  The college, acting in loco parentis, expelled them without a hearing.  The case was appealed to the Fifth Circuit, which held that a public college could not expel students without at least minimal due process.

The case was heard by a panel of John Minor Wisdom, Richard Rives, and Benjamin Franklin Cameron.  Cameron dissented from the opinion of the court.

Thurgood Marshall, Fred Gray, Derrick Bell and Jack Greenberg were among the counsel for the appellants.

See also 
 Tompkins v. Alabama State University

References

Bibliography

External links
JSTOR Constitutional Archives Dixon v. Alabama St. Board of Education
Complete decision

United States substantive due process case law
United States Court of Appeals for the Fifth Circuit cases
1961 in United States case law
Legal history of Alabama
1961 in Alabama
Alabama State University
Civil rights movement case law